Ousmane Diomandé (born 4 December 2003) is an Ivorian professional footballer who plays as a centre-back for Primeira Liga club Sporting CP.

Club career
Diomandé is a youth product of the Ivorian club Olympic Sport Abobo, having joined at the age of 10.

Midtjylland
He moved to the youth academy of the Danish club Midtjylland in January 2020.

On loan to C.D. Mafra
He joined the Portuguese club Mafra on loan on 5 August 2022 on a season-long loan. The next day he made his professional debut with Mafra in a 3–1 Liga Portugal 2 loss to Oliveirense on 6 August 2022.

Back to Sporting
Due to strong performances with Mafra, his loan was cut short halfway through the season and he transferred to Primeira Liga club Sporting CP on 31 January 2023, signing a contract until 2027.

Career statistics

Club

References

External links

2003 births
Living people
Footballers from Abidjan
Ivorian footballers
Association football defenders
FC Midtjylland players
C.D. Mafra players
Sporting CP footballers
Primeira Liga players
Liga Portugal 2 players
Ivorian expatriate footballers
Ivorian expatriates in Denmark
Expatriate footballers in Denmark
Ivorian expatriates in Portugal
Expatriate footballers in Portugal